The Australia cricket team were  scheduled to tour New Zealand in March 2020 to play three Twenty20 International (T20I) matches. New Zealand Cricket confirmed the fixtures for the tour in June 2019. However, on 14 March 2020, the tour was cancelled due to the COVID-19 pandemic.

T20I series

1st T20I

2nd T20I

3rd T20I

References

External links
 Series home at ESPN Cricinfo

2020 in Australian cricket
2020 in New Zealand cricket
International cricket competitions in 2019–20
Australian cricket tours of New Zealand
March 2020 sports events in New Zealand
Cricket events postponed due to the COVID-19 pandemic